Bhojpuri grammar is a set of rules for Bhojpuri language. In many aspects, it is quite similar to other Eastern Indo-Aryan languages.

Nouns 
Nouns in Bhojpuri have three forms, viz. short, long and redundant. Thus, for ghōṛā (Horse), the forms will be ghōṛā, ghoṛwā and ghoṛawā respectively. In some cases, the long form ends with /ē/, ghoṛwē. The redundant form have two more variation, /-ā/ and /-yā/. Thus for kukur (a dog), it can take the form kukurā and for māli (a gardener) maliyā. /-ā/ is used with nouns which have dysyllabic structure like bhatār (bhatarā, Husband) or sonār (sonarā, Goldsmith). The suffix /-yā/ is added to the nouns which end with /-i/ or are feminine by adding /-i/, like bētī (betiyā, daughter) and aurat (auratiyā, women). The oblique for nouns are same as nominative form accept for the verbal nouns.

Definitness 
The redundant form, as called by Greirson, actually does the grammatical task of coding "definiteness" in the noun morphology. It is same as the definite articles the and la of English and French respectively. Thus, ghorawā is "The Horse" and maliyā is "The Gardener".

Morphology 
To characterize the nouns the suffix -wala and -iya is extensively used. -wala is also used in Hindustani but its use is larger is Bhojpuri. It can also be used to the characterizing suffixes of the borrowed words as, /-dār/ in ijjatdār, in Bhojpuri it becomes ijjatwalā. The suffix /-iyā/ (also /-aiyā/, /-vaiyā/ variations) is also used extensively as characterizing suffix, as in kalkatiyā, characteristic or belonging to Kolkata, and puraniyā, characterized by old age.

Gender 
The Animate nouns in Bhojpuri are gendered, those referring to females are feminine and rest are masculine. Feminine is made by adding /-i/, /-in/ and /-ni/ to the masculine nouns as in /ājā - ājī/ (grandfather - grandmother), /māli - mālin/ and /babuā - babunī/ (boy - girl).

Number 
To the plural in Bhojpuri, the long vowel in the end of the noun is shortened and -n, -nh or -ni is added to it. The multitudes like sabh (all) or lōg (people) are also added to the nouns to make plurals.

Cases 
Cases are generally formed by adding prepositions to the Nominative case or the oblique form (if exists) of the nouns. Sometimes true cases are also formed while making Instrumental and Locative by adding -ē, like Bengali. Thus, Locative and Instrumental case of ghar (House) is ghare (in/by the House), this doesn't found in plural forms, however.

 To make Instrumental case; sē, tē, santē and kartē are added to the noun forms, hence ghar se is to the house.
 To make Dative, lā, lag, khātir are added, ex:- ghar la (for the house)
 In Ablative Case, sē, lē are added.

Noun Phrases 
Nouns can be preceded by quantifiers, the quantifiers -gō, -ṭhō and -ṭhē are used with numeral to emphasize the countability as opposed to totality. The limiter expression in Bhojpuri are marked morphologically by using the suffixes -ē and -ō, to show inclusiveness and exclusiveness respectively, as in ham āmē khāïb (I will eat only mangoes) and ham āmō khāïb (I will eat mango, too).

Pronouns

Personl Pronouns
The First person pronoun has two forms viz. inferior (mē) and superior (ham), the inferior form was used in Old Bhojpuri, however is obsolete in Modern Bhojpuri and used in poetry mostly. Ham is used for first Person singular pronoun, the oblique form is Hamrā, however sometimes ham (ham-kē) also serves as oblique form. In Sadri dialect mōe is used instead of ham.

In second person, tē is used for younger, servants and also while speaking disrespectively. Sometimes it's also shows deep affection, a son always uses tē for his mother. tū is ordinarily respectful term and can be used for address anyone younger or older. To show extreme respect or honour raüwā or apnē is used. Demonstrative pronouns ī and ū are used for 3rd personal pronouns in Modern Bhojpuri, the sē and tē of Old Bhojpuri survives but are not used frequently or mostly used in proverbial sense., For e.g. jē jaïsan karī tē taïsan pāï (lit. Who as he does, he so obtains).

Demonstrative Pronouns 

The proximate demonstrative pronouns ("this" or "those") of Modern Bhojpuri are given in the following table.

The genitive form is ēkar, hēkar, inkar, hinkar. Sometimes the suffix -i is added to them and used a feminine. The remote form of demonstrative adjectives can be made by replacing i with u and e with o in the proximate form. Thus, eknī will becomes oknī and so on.

Relative Pronouns 

The relatives pronoun jē in Bhojpuri is same as other Eastern Indo-Aryan languages.

Other Pronouns 

 Keu, Kēhu and Kawano are used as Animate forms of indefinite pronouns and kichu, kuchu, kichuo, kuchuo as inanimate form.

apanā and apne are used to show relative sense, nija is used in instrumental case.

Adjectives 
Like the Nouns, Adjectives also have short, long and redundant forms, e.g. baṛ, baṛkā, baṛkawā. Sometimes, the suffixes -han and -har are also used with adjectives, e.g. lām - lamhar and baṛ - baṛhan.

Adjectives don't depend on the gender of the noun, hence the adjective baṛ (big) is same for laïkā and laïki (girl), just like other Magadhan languages. Bhojpuri, however the long form with suffix /-ka/ and /-kī/ are gendered, thus baṛkā and baṛkī can be used for masculine and feminine respectively.

Degree of Comparison 
There are no inflexions for comparative and superlative forms. The words equivalent to "more" like besi, jiādā, dhēr and "less" like kam are used before the adjectives while comparing:

Sometime comparison is done using the numerals unaïs (nineteen) and bīs (twenty), where former is used for less and later for more.

The superlative is expressed by adding sabh mē or sabh sē or sabh mē baṛhi kē or sabh se baṛhi kē (best of all) before the adjective, for example u laïka sabh mē nīk hawe (the boy is best of all).

Verbs 
Chaterji has classified Bhojpuri verbs in two categories viz. Primary root and secondary root. The former one are those which are inherited from Old Indo Aryan while the latter are causitive, demonative or compounded. Like Bengali, Bhojpuri has two moods, Indicative and Imperative.

History of Bhojpuri Grammars 
The earliest mentions of some grammatical features of Bhojpuri can he found in Buchanan's report on Shahabad in 1812. The detailed grammatical sketch of Bhojpuri was first published by Beames in 1868. In 1877, J.R. Reid tried to give a picture of Bhojpuri spoken in Azamgarh district. Greirson's Linguistic Survey of India Vol. V, Part II, published in 1903, which contained skeleton grammar of Bhojpuri with specimens.

Notes

References
 

 

Indo-Aryan grammars
grammar